San Gregorio nelle Alpi (Veneto: San Regorio) is a comune (municipality) in the Province of Belluno in the Italian region Veneto, located about  northwest of Venice and about  west of Belluno.  
 
San Gregorio nelle Alpi borders the following municipalities: Cesiomaggiore, Santa Giustina, Sospirolo.

References

Cities and towns in Veneto